International Rhodes Grand Prix is a one-day road cycling race held annually since 2017 in the Greek island of Rhodes. It is part of UCI Europe Tour in category 1.2.

Winners

See also
Tour of Rhodes, 
Tour of Greece,

References

Cycle races in Greece
UCI Europe Tour races
Recurring sporting events established in 2017